Korea Educational Broadcasting System or EBS is a South Korean educational public broadcaster and radio network covering South Korean territory, and the only major South Korean radio and television network without a separate regional service. It was established as KBS 3 and KBS Educational Radio in the 1980s, and became an independent corporation in 1990.

Funding 
Though nominally a public broadcasting entity, EBS gets most of its yearly budget from advertisements and sales revenue. In 2012, 72.1% of its revenue came from textbook sales, publications and ad revenues on its TV Radio and internet platforms, while the rest came from TV license fees (EBS gets 3% of the total License Fee being collected by the Korean Broadcasting System) and government grants.

Channels 
 EBS 1 — EBS' main terrestrial channel for premium documentaries, preschool and youth program. (Channel 10.1)
 EBS 2 — EBS' second terrestrial channel. (Channel 10.2)
 EBS FM — A EBS' radio channel, the station focuses mainly on language learning. The actual CSAT listening comprehension examinations are broadcast on this station annually at 8:40 AM and 1:10 PM on the day of the CSAT.
 EBS Plus 1 (subscription television) — The channel focuses greatly around the high school test curriculum and offers programming to complement and amplify the student's in-school education.
 EBS Plus 2 (subscription television) — The main focus of this channel is "lifelong" learning, with various programs for younger and older viewers.
 EBS English (subscription television) — This is the network's English education channel, covering kids from kindergarten to grade 12.
 EBS Kids (subscription television) — EBS' children's channel; formerly a simulcast of EBS Plus 1.

Also EBS offers one pay-television channel, EBS America, in the United States. Its programming centres around Korean culture, language education, and children's shows.

Logos

Programming

Originally-produced 
 Teletoon Advance
Bboongbboong-E
 Piwi-chan! 3D Anime Series
 Chiro
 EBS News 12
 EBS Evening News
 Jisik Channel e (Knowledge Channel e)
 Oops! Ikooo
 Tayo the Little Bus
 Titipo Titipo
 Janghak Quiz
 Ding-Dong-Dang kindergarten
 Miniforce (최강전사 미니특공대)
 GO! GO! Giggles
 English Café
 Vroomiz
 Boni and Hani
 Solver
 Brian's English Adventure
 Cocomong
 Pororo the Little Penguin
 Robocar Poli
 Semi and the Magic Cube
 Super Wings
 Tickety Toc
 Road Diary
 Flowering Heart
 Larva in New York
 Giant Peng TV

Imported series
All foreign cartoons are dubbed in Korean.
 The Magic School Bus
 Arthur
 Animaniacs
 Cyberchase
 Denver, the Last Dinosaur
 Bill Nye the Science Guy
 The Simpsons
 SpongeBob SquarePants
 The Tom and Jerry Show
 Steven Universe
 The Fairly OddParents
 Tiny Toons Adventures
 Rugrats
 All Grown Up!
 The Wild Thornberrys
 Rocket Power
 Teen Titans Go!
 Dora the Explorer
 The Adventures of Jimmy Neutron, Boy Genius
 Yo Gabba Gabba!
 Phineas and Ferb
 Mickey Mouse Clubhouse
 My Friends Tigger & Pooh
 Little Einsteins
 PAW Patrol
 The Flintstones
 The Mozart Band
 The Koala Brothers
 Miles From Tomorrowland
 Ben 10
 Transformers: Prime 
 Hi-5
 Rubberdubbers
 Fireman Sam
 Postman Pat
 Yvon of the Yukon
 Marsupilami
 Untalkative Bunny
 Charlie & Lola
 Thomas and Friends
 Bear in the Big Blue House (
 Ping and Friends()
 Dinosaur Train
 The Loud House
 Gravity Falls
 Almost Naked Animals
 Scaredy Squirrel
 Numb Chucks
 The Jungle Book
 Storm Hawks
 Geronimo Stilton
 Peppa Pig 
 Oswald
 Mike the Knight 
 Bubble Guppies 
 Franklin and Friends
 The New Adventures of Winnie the Pooh
 Henry's World
 The Backyardigans
 Craig of the Creek
 The Amazing World of Gumball
 Sofia the First
 Big City Greens
 Poppy Cat
 Adventure Time
 The Looney Tunes Show
 My Little Pony: Friendship Is Magic
 Chuggington
 Regular Show
 Dragon Tales
 The Lion Guard
 T.U.F.F. Puppy
 The Mr. Men Show
 Clarence
 Mama Mirabelle's Home Movies
 We Bare Bears
 Pingu 
 Caillou 
 Team Umizoomi 
 Shaun the Sheep
 Lunar Jim
 Roary the Racing Car 
 Dirtgirlworld
 Blaze and the Monster Machines
 Harvey Beaks
 LazyTown (Season 1-2 only) 
 Pocoyo 
 Miraculous Ladybug 
 Franny's Feet
 The Save-Ums!
 Little Bear
 Boo!
 Poppets Town
 Connie the Cow
 Jakers! The Adventures of Piggley Winks
 The Paz Show
 Clifford the Big Red Dog
 Paddington Bear
 Maggie and the Ferocious Beast
 Mermaid Melody Pichi Pichi Pitch 
 Mermaid Melody Pichi Pichi Pitch Pure
 Watership Down
 Peep and the Big Wide World
 Timothy Goes to School
 ToddWorld (토드의즐거운세상)
 Star vs. The Forces of Evil
 Ready Jet Go!
 Super Why!
 Doki
 Dot. 
 Oddbods
 Strawberry Shortcake (2003 TV series)
 Messy Goes to Okido
 Angelina Ballerina 
 Olobob Top
 Amphibia
 Rusty Rivets
 Bob the Builder
 Pok & Mok
 Deer Squad
 Big Blue (TV series) 
  Donkey Hodie
 Frog and Friends

EBS Radio 
 Morning Special (8:00~9:00, Mondays through Saturday) and Saturday Morning Special (same time, Saturday)
 CSAT Listening Comprehension (8:40 & 13:10, day of CSAT)

EBS Plus 
 Survival English

See also 
Mass media in South Korea
List of radio stations in South Korea
Television in South Korea

References

External links 

 EBS Introduction  
 EBS Main(TV/Radio) 
 EBS Primary School 
 EBS Middle School 
 EBS CSAT 
 EBS English 
 EBS Foreign Language 
 EBS Math 
 EBS Clipbank 
 EBS Durian(Multicultural) 
 EBS International Documentary Festival  
 EBS SPACE 
 EBS Janghak Quiz 
 EBS Media  

Companies based in Seoul
Mass media companies of South Korea
Publicly funded broadcasters
Educational and instructional television channels
Television networks in South Korea
Children's television networks
Television channels in South Korea
Television channels and stations established in 1980
1980 establishments in South Korea
State media